Vanse is a village in Farsund municipality in Agder county, Norway. The Farsund Airport, Lista is located just west of Vanse. The village was the administrative centre of the old municipality of Lista from 1838 until its dissolution in 1965. The old municipality was known as Vanse from 1838 until 1911.

Vanse Church is a medieval stone church, built in 1037 in the village of Vanse. A stone monument stands near the church. it is a memorial of fatalities during the Gunboat War (1807–1814). It is surrounded by authentic small cannons and a circle of stones with chain. A speech is held by this stone each year on Constitution Day, May 17.

American connections

Kjell Elvis also has his own star in Selvaagpark modelled on the famous Hollywood Walk of Fame.

Media gallery

Notable residents
Kjell Elvis was raised in Vanse
Karl Sanne, politician

References

External links
 American Festival, website

Villages in Agder
Farsund